Smozhe  is a village (selo) in Stryi Raion, Lviv Oblast, in Western Ukraine. Smozhe is located in the Ukrainian Carpathians, within the limits of the Eastern Beskids (Skole Beskids) in southern part of the oblast. It belongs to Kozova rural hromada, one of the hromadas of Ukraine. Local government – Smozhenska village council.

Geography
The village is located along the highway road Highway M06 (Ukraine), on the southern slopes of the ridge Dovzhky (998 – 1056 m).

History 
The first written mention of which dates from the year 1553. Later, King Augustus III created the town, giving him October 24, 1760 Magdeburg rights and emblem. In the Geographical Dictionary of the Kingdom of Poland in volume X (released in 1889) description of Smozhe occupies three pages.
Smozhe was a town with a town hall, several shops and artisan workshops.

Until 18 July 2020, Smozhe belonged to Skole Raion. The raion was abolished in July 2020 as part of the administrative reform of Ukraine, which reduced the number of raions of Lviv Oblast to seven. The area of Skole Raion was merged into Stryi Raion.

Sights 
Preserved in the Smozhe a wooden Church of St. Michael, 1874. Together with Belfry located next are under protection of the state.

References

External links 
  weather.in.ua  
 Населенні пункти Сколівського району  -  Сможе 
 Сколівщина.-Львів.1996 
 Прадідівська слава: база даних українських пам’яток і визначних місць. Сможе.

Literature
 

Villages in Stryi Raion